London station in London, Ontario, Canada is a major interchange for Via Rail trains running from Toronto west to Sarnia and Windsor. The station is a large, modern, wheelchair accessible building on the south end of the city centre, and connects to local public transit bus services.

On October 18, 2021, GO Transit started weekday service between Toronto and London on the Kitchener line. The pilot service does not offer Presto access and riders will need to purchase digital tickets.

History

The first passenger station at this site was completed by Great Western Railway (GWR) in 1853. The station continued to serve the London area for the Grand Trunk Railway after the two companies amalgamated in 1882. The original building survived until 1935 when it was torn down to make way for a new station built by the Canadian National Railway.

The first CN station was demolished and gave way to two structures, a three-storey building at 205 York Street (now home to the CN Credit Union) completed in 1963 and the 10-storey CN Tower Building at 197 York Street built in 1969. The latter building, an International-style structure was closed in 2000 as CN staff dwindled and was imploded at 9:15 a.m., on February 4, 2001. During demolition of the 1969 structure and construction of the present station, train services temporarily reverted to the 1963 station. The old credit union building was incorporated into the current station structure after 2001 and remaining site of the old station became a parking lot. The platform area from the previous stations were retained in the new station.

The International Limited was operated jointly by Via Rail and Amtrak between Chicago and Toronto. The service, which had started in 1982, was discontinued in 2004. The current Corridor service maintains the Canadian section of the International route.

See also

 Quebec City–Windsor Corridor (Via Rail) – trans-provincial passenger rail corridor which includes Stratford
 Rail transport in Ontario

References

External links

Buildings and structures in London, Ontario
Via Rail stations in Ontario
Rail infrastructure in London, Ontario
Passenger rail transport in London, Ontario
Canadian National Railway stations in Ontario
Former Amtrak stations in Canada